= Hay Green =

Hay Green can refer to three villages in England:

- Hay Green, Norfolk
- Hay Green, Hertfordshire
- Hay Green, Essex
